

Events

Pre-1600
 994 – Major Fatimid victory over the Byzantine Empire at the Battle of the Orontes.
1440 – Gilles de Rais, one of the earliest known serial killers, is taken into custody upon an accusation brought against him by  Jean de Malestroit, Bishop of Nantes.
1530 – Appearance of the miraculous portrait of Saint Dominic in Soriano in Soriano Calabro, Calabria, Italy; commemorated as a feast day by the Roman Catholic Church 1644–1912.
1556 – Departing from Vlissingen, ex-Holy Roman Emperor Charles V returns to Spain.

1601–1900
1762 – Seven Years' War: Battle of Signal Hill.
1776 – American Revolutionary War: British forces land at Kip's Bay during the New York Campaign.
1789 – The United States "Department of Foreign Affairs", established by law in July, is renamed the Department of State and given a variety of domestic duties.
1794 – French Revolutionary Wars: Arthur Wellesley (later Duke of Wellington) sees his first combat at the Battle of Boxtel during the Flanders Campaign.
1795 – Britain seizes the Dutch Cape Colony in southern Africa to prevent its use by the Batavian Republic.
1812 – The Grande Armée under Napoleon reaches the Kremlin in Moscow.
  1812   – War of 1812: A second supply train sent to relieve Fort Harrison is ambushed in the Attack at the Narrows.
1816 –  runs aground on the Doom Bar.
1820 – Constitutionalist revolution in Lisbon, Portugal.
1821 – The Captaincy General of Guatemala declares independence from Spain.
1830 – The Liverpool to Manchester railway line opens; British MP William Huskisson becomes the first widely reported railway passenger fatality when he is struck and killed by the locomotive Rocket.
1835 – , with Charles Darwin aboard, reaches the Galápagos Islands. The ship lands at Chatham or San Cristobal, the easternmost of the archipelago.
1862 – American Civil War: Confederate forces capture Harpers Ferry, Virginia (present-day Harpers Ferry, West Virginia).
1873 – Franco-Prussian War: The last Imperial German Army troops leave France upon completion of payment of indemnity.
1894 – First Sino-Japanese War: Japan defeats Qing dynasty China in the Battle of Pyongyang.

1901–present
1915 – New Culture Movement: Chen Duxiu establishes the New Youth magazine in Shanghai.
1916 – World War I: Tanks are used for the first time in battle, at the Battle of the Somme.
1918 – World War I: Allied troops break through the Bulgarian defenses on the Macedonian front.
1935 – Nazi Germany adopts a new national flag bearing the swastika.
1940 – World War II: The climax of the Battle of Britain, when the Luftwaffe launches its largest and most concentrated attack of the entire campaign.
1942 – World War II: U.S. Navy aircraft carrier  is sunk by Japanese torpedoes at Guadalcanal.
1944 – Franklin D. Roosevelt and Winston Churchill meet in Quebec as part of the Octagon Conference to discuss strategy.
  1944   – Battle of Peleliu begins as the United States Marine Corps' 1st Marine Division and the United States Army's 81st Infantry Division hit White and Orange beaches under heavy fire from Japanese infantry and artillery.
1945 – A hurricane strikes southern Florida and the Bahamas, destroying 366 airplanes and 25 blimps at Naval Air Station Richmond.
1947 – Typhoon Kathleen hit the Kantō region in Japan killing 1,077.
1948 – The Indian Army captures the towns of Jalna, Latur, Mominabad, Surriapet and Narkatpalli as part of Operation Polo.
1950 – Korean War: The U.S. X Corps lands at Inchon.
1952 – The United Nations cedes Eritrea to Ethiopia.
1954 – Marilyn Monroe's iconic skirt scene is shot during filming for The Seven Year Itch.
1958 – A Central Railroad of New Jersey commuter train runs through an open drawbridge at the Newark Bay, killing 48.
1959 – Nikita Khrushchev becomes the first Soviet leader to visit the United States.
1962 – The Soviet ship Poltava heads toward Cuba, one of the events that sets into motion the Cuban Missile Crisis.
1963 – Baptist Church bombing: Four children killed in the bombing of an African-American church in Birmingham, Alabama, United States.
1966 – U.S. President Lyndon B. Johnson, responding to a sniper attack at the University of Texas at Austin, writes a letter to Congress urging the enactment of gun control legislation.
1968 – The Soviet Zond 5 spaceship is launched, becoming the first spacecraft to fly around the Moon and re-enter the Earth's atmosphere.
1971 – The first Greenpeace ship departs from Vancouver to protest against the upcoming Cannikin nuclear weapon test in Alaska.
1972 – A Scandinavian Airlines System domestic flight from Gothenburg to Stockholm is hijacked and flown to Malmö Bulltofta Airport.
1974 – Air Vietnam Flight 706 is hijacked, then crashes while attempting to land with 75 on board.
1975 – The French department of "Corse" (the entire island of Corsica) is divided into two: Haute-Corse (Upper Corsica) and Corse-du-Sud (Southern Corsica).
1978 – Muhammad Ali outpoints Leon Spinks in a rematch to become the first boxer to win the world heavyweight title three times at the Superdome in New Orleans.
1981 – The Senate Judiciary Committee unanimously approves Sandra Day O'Connor to become the first female justice of the Supreme Court of the United States.
  1981   – The John Bull becomes the oldest operable steam locomotive in the world when the Smithsonian Institution operates it under its own power outside Washington, D.C.
1983 – Israeli premier Menachem Begin resigns.
1995 – Malaysia Airlines Flight 2133 crashes at Tawau Airport in Malaysia, killing 34.
2001 – During a CART race at the Lausitzring in Germany, former Formula One driver Alex Zanardi suffers a heavy accident resulting in him losing both his legs.
2004 – National Hockey League commissioner Gary Bettman announces lockout of the players' union and cessation of operations by the NHL head office.
2008 – Lehman Brothers files for Chapter 11 bankruptcy, the largest bankruptcy filing in U.S. history.
2011 – Four miners are killed in the Gleision Colliery mining accident in the Swansea Valley, Wales, UK.
2017 – The Parsons Green bombing takes place in London.
2020 – Signing of the Bahrain–Israel normalization agreement occurs in Washington, D.C., normalizing relations between Israel and two Arab nations, the United Arab Emirates and Bahrain.

Births

Pre-1600
767 – Saichō, Japanese monk (d. 822)
1254 – Marco Polo, Italian merchant and explorer (d. 1324)
1461 – Jacopo Salviati, Italian politician (d. 1553)
1505 – Mary of Hungary, Dutch ruler (d. 1558)
1533 – Catherine of Austria, Queen of Poland (d. 1572)
1580 – Charles Annibal Fabrot, French lawyer and author (d. 1659)
1592 – Giovanni Battista Rinuccini, archbishop of Fermo (d. 1653)

1601–1900
1613 – François de La Rochefoucauld, French soldier and author (d. 1680)
1649 – Titus Oates, English minister, fabricated the Popish Plot (d. 1705)
1666 – Sophia Dorothea of Celle (d. 1726)
1690 – Ignazio Prota, Italian composer and educator (d. 1748)
1715 – Jean-Baptiste Vaquette de Gribeauval, French general and engineer (d. 1789)
1736 – Jean Sylvain Bailly, French astronomer, mathematician, and politician, 1st Mayor of Paris (d. 1793)
1759 – Cornelio Saavedra, Argentinean general and politician (d. 1829)
1760 – Bogislav Friedrich Emanuel von Tauentzien, Prussian general (d. 1824)
1765 – Manuel Maria Barbosa du Bocage, Portuguese poet and author (d. 1805)
1789 – James Fenimore Cooper, American novelist, short story writer, and historian (d. 1851)
1815 – Halfdan Kjerulf, Norwegian journalist and composer (d. 1868)
1819 – Cyprien Tanguay, Canadian priest and historian (d. 1902)
1828 – Alexander Butlerov, Russian chemist and academic (d. 1886)
1830 – Porfirio Díaz, Mexican general and politician, 29th President of Mexico (d. 1915)
1846 – George Franklin Grant, African-American educator, dentist, and inventor (d. 1910)
1852 – Edward Bouchet, American physicist and educator (d. 1918)
  1852   – Jan Ernst Matzeliger, Surinamese-American inventor (d. 1889)
1857 – William Howard Taft, American lawyer, jurist, and politician, 27th President of the United States (d. 1930)
  1857   – Anna Winlock, American astronomer and academic (d. 1904)
1858 – Charles de Foucauld, French priest and martyr (d. 1916)
  1858   – Jenő Hubay, Hungarian violinist, composer, and educator (d. 1937)
1861 – M. Visvesvaraya, Indian engineer, scholar, and Bharat Ratna Laureate, Diwan of the Mysore Kingdom (d. 1962)
1863 – Horatio Parker, American organist, composer, and educator (d. 1919)
1864 – Prince Sigismund of Prussia (d. 1866)
1867 – Vladimir May-Mayevsky, Russian general (d. 1920)
1876 – Bruno Walter, German-American pianist, composer, and conductor (d. 1962)
  1876   – Sarat Chandra Chattopadhyay, Bengali novelist (d. 1938) 
1877 – Jakob Ehrlich, Czech-Austrian politician (d. 1938)
  1877   – Yente Serdatzky, Lithuanian-American author and playwright (d. 1962)
1879 – Joseph Lyons, Australian educator and politician, 10th Prime Minister of Australia (d. 1939)
1881 – Ettore Bugatti, Italian-French businessman, founded Bugatti (d. 1947)
1883 – Esteban Terradas i Illa, Spanish mathematician and engineer (d. 1950)
1886 – Paul Lévy, French mathematician and theorist (d. 1971)
1887 – Carlos Dávila, Chilean journalist and politician, President of Chile (d. 1955)
1888 – Antonio Ascari, Italian race car driver (d. 1925)
1889 – Robert Benchley, American humorist, newspaper columnist, and actor  (d. 1945)
  1889   – Claude McKay, Jamaican-American poet and author (d. 1948)
1890 – Ernest Bullock, English organist and composer (d. 1979)
  1890   – Sonja Branting-Westerståhl, Swedish lawyer (d. 1981)
  1890   – Agatha Christie, English crime novelist, short story writer, and playwright (d. 1976)
  1890   – Frank Martin, Swiss-Dutch pianist and composer (d. 1974)
1892 – Silpa Bhirasri, Italian sculptor and educator (d. 1962)
1894 – Chic Harley, American football player (d. 1974)
  1894   – Oskar Klein, Swedish physicist and academic (d. 1977)
  1894   – Jean Renoir, French actor, director, producer, and screenwriter (d. 1979)
1895 – Magda Lupescu, mistress and later wife of King Carol II of Romania (d.1977)
1897 – Merle Curti, American historian and author (d. 1997)
1898 – J. Slauerhoff, Dutch poet and author (d. 1936)

1901–present
1901 – Donald Bailey, English engineer, designed Bailey bridge (d. 1985)
1903 – Roy Acuff, American singer-songwriter and fiddler (d. 1992)
1904 – Umberto II of Italy (d. 1983)
  1904   – Sheilah Graham Westbrook, English-American actress, journalist, and author (d. 1988)
1906 – Jacques Becker, French actor, director, and screenwriter (d. 1960)
  1906   – Walter E. Rollins, American songwriter (d. 1973)
1907 – Gunnar Ekelöf, Swedish poet and author (d. 1968)
  1907   – Fay Wray, Canadian-American actress (d. 2004)
1908 – Kid Sheik, American trumpet player (d. 1996)
  1908   – Penny Singleton, American actress and singer (d. 2003)
1909 – C. N. Annadurai, Indian educator and politician, 7th Chief Minister of Tamil Nadu (d. 1969)
  1909   – Phil Arnold, American actor (d. 1968)
1910 – Betty Neels, English nurse and author (d. 2001)
1911 – Karsten Solheim, Norwegian-American businessman, founded PING (d. 2000)
  1911   – Luther Terry, American physician and academic, 9th Surgeon General of the United States (d. 1985)
1913 – Henry Brant, Canadian-American composer and conductor (d. 2008)
  1913   – Bruno Hoffmann, German glass harp player (d. 1991)
  1913   – John N. Mitchell, American lawyer, and politician, 67th United States Attorney General (d. 1988)
  1913   – Johannes Steinhoff, German general and pilot (d. 1994)
1914 – Creighton Abrams, American general (d. 1974)
  1914   – Adolfo Bioy Casares, Argentinian journalist and author (d. 1999)
  1914   – Orhan Kemal, Turkish author (d. 1970)
  1914   – Robert McCloskey, American author and illustrator (d. 2003)
1915 – Fawn M. Brodie, American historian and author (d. 1981)
  1915   – Al Casey, American guitarist and composer (d. 2005)
  1915   – Albert Whitlock, English-American special effects designer (d. 1999)
1916 – Margaret Lockwood, Pakistani-English actress (d. 1990)
  1916   – Frederick C. Weyand, American general (d. 2010)
1917 – Hilde Gueden, Austrian soprano (d. 1988)
  1917   – Buddy Jeannette, American basketball player and coach (d. 1998)
1918 – Alfred D. Chandler Jr., American historian and academic (d. 2007)
  1918   – Phil Lamason, New Zealand soldier and pilot (d. 2012)
  1918   – Margot Loyola, Chilean singer-songwriter and guitarist (d. 2015)
  1918   – Nipsey Russell, American comedian and actor (d. 2005)
1919 – Fausto Coppi, Italian cyclist and soldier (d. 1960)
  1919   – Nelson Gidding, American author and screenwriter (d. 2004)
  1919   – Heda Margolius Kovály, Czech author and translator (d. 2010)
1920 – Kym Bonython, Australian race car driver, drummer, and radio host (d. 2011)
1921 – Richard Gordon, English surgeon and author (d. 2017)
  1921   – Gene Roland, American pianist and composer (d. 1982)
1922 – Bob Anderson, English fencer and choreographer (d. 2012)
  1922   – Jackie Cooper, American actor (d. 2011)
  1922   – Gaetano Cozzi, Italian historian and academic (d. 2001)
  1922   – Mary Soames, English author (d. 2014)
1923 – Anton Heiller, Austrian organist, composer, and conductor (d. 1979)
1924 – Lucebert, Dutch poet and painter (d. 1994)
  1924   – György Lázár, Hungarian politician, 50th Prime Minister of Hungary (d. 2014)
  1924   – Bobby Short, American singer and pianist (d. 2005)
  1924   – Mordechai Tzipori, Israeli politician and soldier (d. 2017)
1925 – Stanley Chapman, English architect and author (d. 2009)
  1925   – Erika Köth, German soprano (d. 1981)
  1925   – Carlo Rambaldi, Italian special effects artist (d. 2012)
  1925   – Helle Virkner, Danish actress and singer (d. 2009)
1926 – Shohei Imamura, Japanese director, producer, and screenwriter (d. 2006)
  1926   – Jean-Pierre Serre, French mathematician and academic 
  1926   – Henry Silva, American actor (d. 2022)
1927 – Rudolf Anderson, pilot and commissioned officer in the United States Air Force (d. 1962)
  1927   – Norm Crosby, American comedian and actor (d. 2020)
  1927   – David Stove, Australian philosopher and academic (d. 1994)
1928 – Cannonball Adderley, American saxophonist and bandleader (d. 1975)
1929 – Eva Burrows, Australian 13th General of The Salvation Army (d. 2015)
  1929   – Murray Gell-Mann, American physicist and academic, Nobel Prize laureate (d. 2019)
  1929   – Stan Kelly-Bootle, English singer-songwriter, computer scientist, and author (d. 2014)
  1929   – Dick Latessa, American actor (d. 2016)
  1929   – John Julius Norwich, English historian and author (d. 2018)
  1929   – Wilbur Snyder, American football player and wrestler (d. 1991)
  1929   – Mümtaz Soysal, Turkish academic and politician, 30th Turkish Minister of Foreign Affairs (d. 2019)
1930 – Endel Lippmaa, Estonian physicist and academic (d. 2015) 
1931 – Brian Henderson, New Zealand-Australian journalist, actor, and producer (d. 2021)
1932 – Neil Bartlett, English-American chemist and academic (d. 2008)
1933 – Rafael Frühbeck de Burgos, Spanish conductor and composer (d. 2014)
1934 – Tomie dePaola, American author and illustrator (d. 2020)
  1934   – Fred Nile, Australian soldier, minister, and politician
1935 – Dinkha IV, Iraqi patriarch (d. 2015)
1936 – Ashley Cooper, Australian tennis player (d. 2020)
  1936   – Sara Henderson, Australian farmer and author (d. 2005)
1937 – Joey Carew, Trinidadian cricketer (d. 2011)
  1937   – Fernando de la Rúa, Argentinian lawyer and politician, 51st President of Argentina (d. 2019)
  1937   – King Curtis Iaukea, American wrestler (d. 2010)
  1937   – Robert Lucas Jr., American economist and academic, Nobel Prize laureate
  1937   – Pino Puglisi, Italian priest and martyr (d. 1993)
1938 – Gaylord Perry, American baseball player and coach (d. 2022)
1939 – Subramanian Swamy, Indian economist, academic, and politician, Indian Minister of Law and Justice
  1939   – George Walden, English journalist and politician
1940 – Merlin Olsen, American football player, sportscaster, and actor (d. 2010)
1941 – Flórián Albert, Hungarian footballer and manager (d. 2011)
  1941   – Signe Toly Anderson, American rock singer (d. 2016)
  1941   – Mirosław Hermaszewski, Polish general, pilot and cosmonaut (d. 2022)
  1941   – Yuriy Norshteyn, Russian animator, director, and screenwriter
  1941   – Viktor Zubkov, Russian businessman and politician, 37th Prime Minister of Russia
1942 – Lee Dorman, American bass player (d. 2012)
  1942   – Philip Harris, Baron Harris of Peckham, English businessman and politician
  1942   – Ksenia Milicevic, French painter and architect
1944 – Mauro Piacenza, Italian cardinal
  1944   – Graham Taylor, English footballer and manager (d. 2017)
1945 – Carmen Maura, Spanish actress
  1945   – Jessye Norman, American soprano (d. 2019)
  1945   – Hans-Gert Pöttering, German lawyer and politician, 23rd President of the European Parliament
  1945   – Ron Shelton, American director, producer, and screenwriter
1946 – Tommy Lee Jones, American actor, director, producer, and screenwriter
  1946   – Mike Procter, South African cricketer, coach, and referee
  1946   – Oliver Stone, American director, screenwriter, and producer
  1946   – Howard Waldrop, American author and critic
1947 – Russel L. Honoré, retired lieutenant general best known for serving as commander of Joint Task Force Katrina responsible for coordinating military relief efforts for Hurricane Katrina–affected areas across the Gulf Coast
  1947   – Viggo Jensen, Danish footballer and manager
  1947   – Diane E. Levin, American educator and author
  1947   – Theodore Long, American wrestling referee and manager
1949 – Joe Barton, American lawyer and politician
1950 – Rajiv Malhotra, Indian author
  1950   – Mirza Masroor Ahmad, Pakistani-English caliph and scholar
1951 – Pete Carroll, American football player and coach
  1951   – Johan Neeskens, Dutch footballer and manager
  1951   – Fred Seibert, owner of Nickelodeon and Frederator Studios
1952 – Richard Brodeur, Canadian ice hockey player and sportscaster
  1952   – Paula Duncan, Australian actress
  1952   – Ratnajeevan Hoole, Sri Lankan engineer and academic
  1952   – Kelly Keagy, American singer and drummer 
1953 – Keiko Takeshita, Japanese actress
  1953   – Margie Moran, Filipino peace advocate and beauty queen, Miss Universe 1973
1954 – Adrian Adonis, American wrestler (d. 1988)
  1954   – Hrant Dink, Turkish journalist (d. 2007)
1955 – Željka Antunović, Croatian politician, 9th Croatian Minister of Defence
  1955   – Abdul Qadir, Pakistani cricketer (d. 2019)
  1955   – Bruce Reitherman, American voice actor, singer, cinematographer, and producer
  1955   – Renzo Rosso, Italian fashion designer and businessman, co-founded Diesel Clothing
1956 – Ross J. Anderson, British academic and educator
  1956   – Maggie Reilly, Scottish singer-songwriter 
  1956   – Ned Rothenberg, American saxophonist, clarinet player, and composer
1958 – Joel Quenneville, Canadian ice hockey player and coach
  1958   – Wendie Jo Sperber, American actress (d. 2005)
1959 – Mark Kirk, American commander, lawyer, and politician
1960 – Ed Solomon, American director, producer, and screenwriter
  1960   – Lisa Vanderpump, British restaurateur, television personality, and author
1961 – Terry Lamb, Australian rugby league player and coach
  1961   – Helen Margetts, British political scientist
  1961   – Dan Marino, American football player and sportscaster
  1961   – Patrick Patterson, Jamaican cricketer
1962 – Amanda Wakeley, English fashion designer
1963 – Pete Myers, American basketball player and coach
  1963   – Stephen C. Spiteri, Maltese military historian
1964 – Robert Fico, Slovak academic and politician, 14th Prime Minister of Slovakia
  1964   – Steve Watkin, Welsh cricketer
  1964   – Doyle Wolfgang von Frankenstein, American guitarist and songwriter
1966 – Wenn V. Deramas, Filipino director and screenwriter (d. 2016) 
  1966   – Sherman Douglas, American basketball player
1967 – Paul Abbott, American baseball player and coach
  1967   – Rodney Eyles, Australian squash player
1969 – Revaz Arveladze, Georgian footballer
  1969   – Corby Davidson, American radio personality
  1969   – Allen Shellenberger, American drummer (d. 2009)
1971 – Nathan Astle, New Zealand cricketer and coach
  1971   – Josh Charles, American actor and director
  1971   – Wayne Ferreira, South African tennis player
  1971   – Ben Wallers, English singer-songwriter and guitarist 
1972 – Jimmy Carr, English comedian, actor, producer, and screenwriter
  1972   – Queen Letizia of Spain
  1972   – Lady Victoria, American wrestler
1973 – Prince Daniel, Duke of Västergötland, Swedish prince
1974 – Arata Iura, Japanese actor, model, and fashion designer
1975 – Tom Dolan, American swimmer
  1975   – Martina Krupičková, Czech painter
1976 – Brett Kimmorley, Australian rugby league player and sportscaster
  1976   – Paul Thomson, Scottish drummer 
  1976   – Matt Thornton, American baseball player
1977 – Chimamanda Ngozi Adichie,  Nigerian author
  1977   – Angela Aki, Japanese singer-songwriter
  1977   – Sophie Dahl, English model and author
  1977   – Leander Jordan, American football player
  1977   – Jason Terry, American basketball player
1978 – Zach Filkins, American guitarist
  1978   – Eiður Guðjohnsen, Icelandic footballer
  1978   – Genki Horiguchi, Japanese wrestler
1979 – Dave Annable,  American actor
  1979   – Patrick Marleau, Canadian ice hockey player
  1979   – Carlos Ruiz, Guatemalan footballer
  1979   – Reece Young, New Zealand cricketer
1980 – David Diehl, American football player and sportscaster
  1980   – Mike Dunleavy Jr., American basketball player
1981 – Ben Schwartz, American actor, comedian and writer
1983 – Yuka Hirata, Japanese actress and model
  1983   – Luke Hochevar, American baseball player
1984 – Prince Harry, Duke of Sussex 
  1984   – Loek van Mil, Dutch baseball player (d. 2019)
  1984   – Cyhi the Prynce, American rapper and producer
1985 – François-Olivier Roberge, Canadian speed skater
1986 – Jenna Marbles, American YouTuber and comedian
  1986   – George Watsky, American hip-hop artist, poet and author
1987 – Vaila Barsley, Scottish footballer
  1987   – Aly Cissokho, French footballer
  1987   – Rhett Titus, American wrestler
1988 – Tim Moltzen, Australian rugby league player
1990 – Oliver Gill, English footballer
  1990   – Aaron Mooy, Australian footballer
1991 – Phil Ofosu-Ayeh, German-Ghanaian footballer
1991   – Lee Jung-shin, South Korean musician and actor
1992 – Jae Park, South Korean-American singer
1995 – Joe Ofahengaue, New Zealand-Tongan rugby league player
1993 – JP Tokoto, American basketball player
1997 – Quin Houff, American racing driver

Deaths

Pre-1600
 921 – Ludmila of Bohemia, Czech martyr and saint (b. 860)
1140 – Adelaide of Hungary, Duchess of Bohemia
1146 – Alan, 1st Earl of Richmond, English soldier (b. 1100)
1231 – Louis I, Duke of Bavaria (b. 1173)
1326 – Dmitry of Tver (b. 1299)
1352 – Ewostatewos, Ethiopian monk and saint (b. 1273)
1397 – Adam Easton, English cardinal
1408 – Edmund Holland, 4th Earl of Kent, English politician (b. 1384)
1496 – Hugh Clopton, Lord Mayor of London (b. c. 1440)
1500 – John Morton, English cardinal and academic (b. 1420)
1504 – Elisabeth of Bavaria, Electress of the Palatinate (b. 1478)
1510 – Saint Catherine of Genoa (b. 1447)
1559 – Isabella Jagiellon, Queen of Hungary (d. 1519)
1595 – John MacMorran, Baillie of Edinburgh, shot by rioting high school schoolchildren.
1596 – Leonhard Rauwolf, German physician and botanist (b. 1535)

1601–1900
1613 – Thomas Overbury, English poet and author (b. 1581)
1643 – Richard Boyle, 1st Earl of Cork, English-Irish politician, Lord High Treasurer of Ireland (b. 1566)
1649 – John Floyd, English priest and educator (b. 1572)
1700 – André Le Nôtre, French gardener (b. 1613)
1701 – Edmé Boursault, French author and playwright (b. 1638)
1707 – George Stepney, English poet and diplomat (b. 1663)
1712 – Sidney Godolphin, 1st Earl of Godolphin, English politician, Lord High Treasurer (b. 1645)
1750 – Charles Theodore Pachelbel, German organist and composer (b. 1690)
1794 – Abraham Clark, American police officer and politician (b. 1725)
1803 – Gian Francesco Albani, Italian cardinal (b. 1719)
1813 – Antoine Étienne de Tousard, French general and engineer (b. 1752)
1830 – François Baillairgé, Canadian painter and sculptor (b. 1759)
  1830   – William Huskisson, English financier and politician, Secretary of State for War and the Colonies (b. 1770)
1841 – Alessandro Rolla, Italian violinist and composer (b. 1757)
1842 – Pierre Baillot, French violinist and composer (b. 1771)
  1842   – Francisco Morazán, Guatemalan general, lawyer,  and politician, President of Central American Federation (b. 1792)
1852 – Johann Karl Simon Morgenstern, German-Estonian philologist and academic (b. 1770)
1859 – Isambard Kingdom Brunel, English architect and engineer, designed the Great Western Railway (b. 1806)
1864 – John Hanning Speke, English soldier and explorer (b. 1827)
1874 – Charles-Amédée Kohler, Swiss chocolatier (b. 1790)
1883 – Joseph Plateau, Belgian physicist and academic (b. 1801)
1893 – Thomas Hawksley, English engineer (b. 1807)

1901–present
1915 – Ernest Gagnon, Canadian organist and composer (b. 1834)
1921 – Roman von Ungern-Sternberg, Austrian-Russian general (b. 1886)
1926 – Rudolf Christoph Eucken, German philosopher and academic, Nobel Prize laureate (b. 1846)
1930 – Milton Sills, American actor and screenwriter (b. 1882)
1938 – Thomas Wolfe, American novelist (b. 1900)
1940 – William B. Bankhead, American lawyer and politician, 47th Speaker of the United States House of Representatives (b. 1874)
1945 – André Tardieu, French journalist and politician, 97th Prime Minister of France (b. 1876)
  1945   – Anton Webern, Austrian composer and conductor (b. 1883)
  1945   – Linnie Marsh Wolfe, American librarian and author (b. 1881)
1952 – Hugo Raudsepp, Estonian author and playwright (b. 1883)
1965 – Steve Brown, American bassist (b. 1890)
1972 – Ulvi Cemal Erkin, Turkish composer and educator (b. 1906)
  1972   – Baki Süha Ediboğlu, Turkish poet and author (b. 1915)
  1972   – Geoffrey Fisher, English archbishop and academic (b. 1887)
1973 – Gustaf VI Adolf of Sweden (b. 1882)
1975 – Franco Bordoni, Italian race car driver and pilot (b. 1913)
1978 – Robert Cliche, Canadian lawyer, judge, and politician (b. 1921)
  1978   – Edmund Crispin, English writer and composer (b. 1921)
  1978   – Willy Messerschmitt, German engineer and academic, designed the Messerschmitt Bf 109 (b. 1898)
1980 – Bill Evans, American pianist and composer (b. 1929)
1981 – Rafael Méndez, Mexican trumpet player and composer (b. 1906)
1983 – Prince Far I, Jamaican DJ and producer (b. 1944)
1985 – Cootie Williams, American trumpet player (b. 1910)
1989 – Jan DeGaetani, American soprano (b. 1933)
  1989   – Olga Erteszek, Polish-American fashion designer (b. 1916)
  1989   – Robert Penn Warren, American novelist, poet, and literary critic (b. 1905)
1991 – John Hoyt, American actor (b. 1904)
  1991   – Warner Troyer, Canadian journalist and author (b. 1932)
1993 – Pino Puglisi, Italian priest and martyr (b. 1937)
1995 – Harry Calder, South African cricketer (b. 1901)
  1995   – Gunnar Nordahl, Swedish footballer and manager (b. 1921)
1997 – Bulldog Brower, American wrestler (b. 1933)
1998 – Louis Rasminsky, Canadian economist, 3rd Governor of the Bank of Canada (b. 1908)
2001 – June Salter, Australian actress and author (b. 1932)
2003 – Garner Ted Armstrong, American evangelist and author (b. 1930)
2004 – Johnny Ramone, American guitarist and songwriter (b. 1948)
  2004   – Walter Stewart, Canadian journalist and author (b. 1931)
2005 – Guy Green, English director and cinematographer (b. 1913)
  2005   – Sidney Luft, American manager and producer (b. 1915)
2006 – Raymond Baxter, English television host and author (b. 1922)
  2006   – Oriana Fallaci, Italian journalist and author (b. 1929)
  2006   – Pablo Santos, Mexican-American actor (b. 1987)
2007 – Colin McRae, Scottish race car driver (b. 1968)
  2007   – Jeremy Moore, English general (b. 1928)
  2007   – Aldemaro Romero, Venezuelan pianist, composer, and conductor (b. 1928)
  2007   – Brett Somers, Canadian-American actress and singer (b. 1924)
  2008   – Richard Wright, English singer-songwriter and keyboard player (b. 1943)
2009 – Troy Kennedy Martin, Scottish-English screenwriter (b. 1932)
2010 – Arrow, Caribbean singer-songwriter (b. 1949)
2011 – Frances Bay, Canadian-American actress (b. 1919)
2012 – Tibor Antalpéter, Hungarian volleyball player and diplomat,  Ambassador of Hungary to the United Kingdom (b. 1930)
  2012   – Nevin Spence, Northern Irish rugby player (b. 1990)
2013 – Habib Munzir Al-Musawa, Indonesian cleric and scholar (b. 1973)
  2013   – Jerry G. Bishop, American radio and television host (b. 1936)
  2013   – Gerard Cafesjian, American businessman and philanthropist (b. 1925)
  2013   – Jackie Lomax, English singer-songwriter and guitarist (b. 1944)
2014 – John Anderson Jr., American lawyer and politician, 36th Governor of Kansas (b. 1917)
  2014   – Eugene I. Gordon, American physicist and engineer (b. 1930)
  2014   – Nicholas Romanov, Prince of Russia (b. 1922)
  2014   – Jürg Schubiger, Swiss psychotherapist and author (b. 1936)
  2014   – Wayne Tefs, Canadian anthologist, author, and critic (b. 1947)
2015 – Harry J. Lipkin, Israeli physicist and academic (b. 1921)
  2015   – Meir Pa'il, Israeli commander, historian, and politician (b. 1926)
  2015   – Bernard Van de Kerckhove, Belgian cyclist (b. 1941)
2017 – Harry Dean Stanton, American actor (b. 1926) 
2019 – Ric Ocasek, American musician (b. 1944) 
2021 – Lou Angotti, Canadian ice hockey player and coach (b. 1938)

Holidays and observances
Battle of Britain Day (United Kingdom)
Christian feast day:
Joseph Abibos
Alpinus (Albinus) of Lyon
Aprus (Èvre) of Toul
Catherine of Genoa
James Chisholm (Episcopal Church)
Saint Dominic in Soriano (formerly)
Mamilian of Palermo
Mirin
Nicetas the Goth
Nicomedes
Our Lady of Sorrows
September 15 (Eastern Orthodox liturgics)
 Cry of Dolores, celebrated on the eve of Independence Day (Mexico).
Earliest day on which Father's Day can fall, while September 21 is the latest; celebrated on the third Sunday in September. (Ukraine)
Earliest day on which German-American Steuben Parade can fall, while September 21 is the latest; celebrated on the third Saturday in September. (United States, especially New York City)
Earliest day on which POW/MIA Recognition Day can fall, while September 21 is the latest; celebrated on the third Friday in September. (United States)
Earliest day on which Prinsjesdag can fall, while September 21 is the latest; celebrated on the third Tuesday in September. (Netherlands)
Earliest day on which Respect for the Aged Day can fall, while September 21 is the latest; celebrated on the third Monday in September. (Japan)
 Engineer's Day (India)
 Independence Day, celebrates the Act of Independence of Central America from Spain in 1821 of Guatemala (a Patriotic Day), El Salvador, Honduras, Nicaragua, and Costa Rica.
 International Day of Democracy
 Knowledge Day (Azerbaijan)
 Restoration of Primorska to the Motherland Day (Slovenia)
 Silpa Bhirasri Day (Thailand).
 The beginning of German American Heritage Month, celebrated until October 15
 The beginning of National Hispanic Heritage Month, celebrated until October 15 (United States)
 World Lymphoma Awareness Day (International)

References

External links

 
 
 

Days of the year
September